Home Again may refer to:

Film and television
 Home Again (2012 film), a Canadian drama directed by Sudz Sutherland
 Home Again (2017 film), an American romantic comedy directed by Hallie Meyers-Shyer
 Home Again (2022 film), a Gambian documentary film directed by Babucarr Manka

 Home Again (TV series), a 2006 British sitcom
 Bob Vila's Home Again, a television program hosted by Bob Vila
 "Home Again" (The X-Files), a television episode

Music

Albums
 Home...Again or the title song, by Abigail, 2005
 Home Again! (Doc Watson album), 1966
 Home Again (Edwyn Collins album) or the title song, 2007
 Home Again (Jimmy Somerville album) or the title song, 2004
 Home Again (Judy Collins album) or the title song, 1984
 Home Again (Michael Kiwanuka album) or the title song (see below), 2012
 Home Again (New Edition album) or the title song, 1996
 Home Again (The Tambourines album) or the title song, 2003

Songs
 "Home Again" (song), by Michael Kiwanuka, 2012
 "Home Again", by The Auteurs from New Wave, 1993
 "Home Again", by Barry Manilow from Barry Manilow II, 1974
 "Home Again", by Blackmore's Night from Fires at Midnight, 2001
 "Home Again", by Bryan Adams from Into the Fire, 1987
 "Home Again", by Carole King from Tapestry, 1971
 "Home Again", by Disco Biscuits from They Missed the Perfume, 2001
 "Home Again", by Elton John from The Diving Board, 2013
 "Home Again", by Hear'Say, 2001
 "Home Again", by Hootie & the Blowfish from Musical Chairs, 1998
 "Home Again!", by Menahan Street Band from Make the Road by Walking, 2008
 "Home Again", by Oingo Boingo from BOI-NGO, 1987
 "Home Again", by Shihad from Shihad, 1996
 "Home Again", by Stone Sour from Audio Secrecy, 2010

See also
 Home Again, Home Again, a 2007 EP by Hem
 Back Home Again (disambiguation)